Federica Carta (born 21 June 2000) is an Italian field hockey player for the Italian national team.

She participated at the 2018 Women's Hockey World Cup.

References

2000 births
Living people
Italian female field hockey players
Female field hockey forwards